Jonatan Tollås Nation (born 1 July 1990) is a former Norwegian professional footballer.

Club career
Tollås came to Aalesund in 2007 from local youth club Blindheim IL. He made his league debut on 1 July 2008 appearing in a 3–1 home win against Strømsgodset IF. He made regular appearances in the following matches, mainly due to center back Benjamin Kibebe being injured. Eventually Tollås would be a part of the a new up-and-coming generation of young players forming the backbone of the Aafk team. By the end of July 2008, ten out of eleven starting players were under the age of 22. His decent performance led to him being scouted along with teammate Peter Orry Larsen by the Serie-A side Udinese, however no deal was reached.

Ahead of the 2009 season Aafk's new coach Kjetil Rekdal signaled that he envisioned Tollås would be made the first choice for center back, pairing up with Daniel Arnefjord. Both Rekdal and Arnefjord praised the youngster as a talent, and claimed he had even greater potential. Despite plenty of playing time, the season however turned out to be mixed for Tollås, an injury kept him on the sidelines for most of the summer, and he was jeered by frustrated home supporters during a home draw against Sandefjord Fotball. Despite this, he was selected to start the 2009 Norwegian Cup final which Aafk brought home for the first time.

The following season looked more promising for the young defender. Tollås himself hoped to be selected as first choice for the starting eleven for the entire season, as he admitted that the previous season had been "disappointing" for his part. Coach Rekdal stated that Tollås needed to be more "daring" and "concentrated" for him to succeed. After subjecting himself to a regime of strenuous physical exercise, Tollås delivered a stable performance in the season where Aafk finished at a record 4th place in the league.

Tollås was made second choice for central defence throughout the first half of the 2011-season, most of the times with Daniel Arnefjord. His break came during the europa league match against AZ when he replaced Ville Jalasto who had until then been favored over him. the match was a disaster for AaFK, who were thrashed 7–1 on aggregate. The second half of the season proved successful for Tollås, starting with the match against Sogndal Fotball, AaFK and Tollås kept a clean sheet for five consecutive games. The marked improvement in Tollås' gameplay earned him a new contract with the club, lasting out the 2014 season. Like the 2009 season, AaFK made it all the way to the Norwegian Cup Final. This time facing SK Brann and just like in 2009, Tollås played the entire match, bringing the gold home to Aalesund for the second time. His decent play during the 2011-season paid off for him by being selected to the Under-23 national team together with teammate Fredrik Ulvestad. The 2012 season saw Tollås achieve the feat of being first choice for full back. Sports commentators as well as the coach praised Tollås for finally stepping up and "cracking the code".

International career
Tollås was first capped for Norway when he played for the under-17 team in 2007. He has later represented Norway at under-18, under-19 and under-21 level.

Career statistics

Honours

Club
Aalesund
Norwegian Football Cup: 2009, 2011

Personal life
A notorious prankster, Tollås is well known for playing practical jokes on his teammates. In September 2011, he was a "suspect" when the car of reserve-goalkeeper Ole-Christian Rørvik was found covered in Post-it Notes. Tollås however, while applauding the initiative, denied having pulled the prank. In another incident, Tollås secretly snapped a close-up photo of an unidentified naked teammate in the locker room. Tollås then proceeded to post the image on Twitter, which caused some controversy. After being reprimanded by the club, Tollås jokingly responded to the controversy by stating that his goal was to upload one new nude photo "every day".

References

External links
 

Norwegian footballers
Aalesunds FK players
1990 births
Living people
Association football defenders
Eliteserien players
Norwegian Second Division players
Sportspeople from Ålesund
Sportspeople from Møre og Romsdal
Vålerenga Fotball players
Norway youth international footballers
Norway under-21 international footballers